Jannik Sinner was the defending champion but chose not to defend his title.

Jason Kubler won the title after defeating Alejandro Tabilo 7–5, 6–7(2–7), 7–5 in the final.

Seeds

Draw

Finals

Top half

Bottom half

References

External links
Main draw
Qualifying draw

Kentucky Bank Tennis Championships - 1
2021 Singles